The Settles Hotel is a historic 15-story hotel located at 200 East Third Street in Big Spring, Texas. Originally completed in 1930, the Settles opened for business October 1, 1930. It operated from 1930 until the early 1980s, and was subsequently abandoned for around 30 years, before reopening in late 2012.

The building was purchased by the Settles Hotel Development Corporation in late 2006. Since that time, the SHDC has also acquired adjoining properties, including the Big Spring Boys and Girls Club and the abandoned Greyhound Bus terminal, which was then demolished.

The building was listed on the National Register of Historic Places on April 18, 2013. Hotel Settles is a member of Historic Hotels of America, the official program of the National Trust for Historic Preservation.

Reopening 
The Hotel Settles re-opened its doors to the public on December 28, 2012. Construction on other parts of the Hotel continued through 2013.

On April 10, 2015, the West Texas Historical Association at its 92nd annual conference in Amarillo, presented a lecture and discussion on the Hotel Settles: "A Grand Dame Shines Again: Big Spring's Hotel Settles During Eighty-five Years of Boom, Bust, and Boom" by Barbara Brannon.

See also

National Register of Historic Places listings in Howard County, Texas
Recorded Texas Historic Landmarks in Howard County

References

External links 

Hotel Settles website
Photos of the Llano Estacado

Hotels in Texas
Buildings and structures in Howard County, Texas
Hotel buildings completed in 1930
Hotels established in 1930
Recorded Texas Historic Landmarks
Historic Hotels of America